Benjamín Maldonado (born 13 May 1928, date of death unknown) was a Bolivian football forward who played for Bolivia in the 1950 FIFA World Cup. He also played for Club Deportivo San José. Maldonado is deceased.

References

External links

FIFA profile

1928 births
Year of death missing
Bolivian footballers
Bolivia international footballers
Association football forwards
Club San José players
1950 FIFA World Cup players